Gusheh-ye Olya or Gusheh-ye Bala, both meaning "Upper Gusheh",  may refer to:
 Gusheh-ye Olya, Kohgiluyeh and Boyer-Ahmad
 Gusheh-ye Olya, Markazi
 Gusheh-ye Olya, South Khorasan

See also
 Kusheh-ye Olya (disambiguation)